Dr. Dean may refer to:

 Dr. Dean Edell, host of the Dr. Dean Edell radio program
 Dr. Howard Dean, former Democratic Governor of Vermont, former Presidential Candidate, and former head of the Democratic National Committee